Chukiat Noosarung (Thai ชูเกียรติ หนูสลุง) is a Thai former football player. He is a defender who scored 4 goals for the Thailand national team, and played in several FIFA World Cup qualifying matches. In present, he is currently player-manager of Chaiyaphum United in the Thai Second Division of the football league.

International goals

References 

1971 births
Living people
Chukiat Noosarung
Chukiat Noosarung
2000 AFC Asian Cup players
Expatriate footballers in Vietnam
Chukiat Noosarung
Southeast Asian Games medalists in football
Thai expatriate sportspeople in Vietnam
Association football defenders
Competitors at the 1995 Southeast Asian Games
Chukiat Noosarung
Hoang Anh Gia Lai FC players
V.League 1 players
Footballers at the 1994 Asian Games
Chukiat Noosarung
Chukiat Noosarung